Floyd C. Miller (January 11, 1902 – December 10, 1985) was an American politician  who served on the Seattle City Council 1956–1969 (serving as Council President from 1962–64 and 1968–69), after which he was interim mayor of Seattle, Washington for nine months between March 23, 1969 and December 1, 1969, filling out the term of James d'Orma Braman, who had been appointed Assistant Secretary of the United States Department of Transportation. During his short mayoral tenure, Seattle's first Major League Baseball team, the Pilots began play, but would move after only one season to Milwaukee to become the Brewers.

Miller died on December 10, 1985.

Notes

1902 births
1985 deaths
Mayors of Seattle
20th-century American politicians